Selloi is a former municipality in the Ioannina regional unit, Epirus, Greece. Since 2011, local government reform it is part of the municipality of Dodoni, of which it is a municipal unit. The municipal unit has an area of 166.432 km2. Is in the southwest of the Ioannina regional unit. The municipal unit is subdivided into fifteen communities.

The seat of the municipality was in Tyria, a village of the community of Baousioi next to the river Tyria. From there is passing the Via Egnatia Road (A/K of Selli). The name comes from the ancient Selloi who lived around Dodona.

Tourist sites include the cave of the bears, the Stournari Well and the Batzarion Cheese Factory.

References

Populated places in Ioannina (regional unit)